NEA Baptist Memorial Hospital is a 228-bed healthcare facility in Jonesboro, Arkansas. It is part of the NEA Baptist Health System and Baptist Memorial Health Care. The NEA Baptist Medical Campus is built on 85 acres of land, combining NEA Baptist Memorial Hospital and specialists of the NEA Baptist Clinic. The new facility features an integrated medical office building and hospital. The new hospital is a six-story structure with 181 beds with expansion space for 300 beds total. The NEA Baptist Clinic consists of two multispecialty physician structures. The campus also houses a free-standing 34,000 square-foot advanced cancer treatment center featuring radiation therapy, chemotherapy, medical oncology, clinical research, as well as supportive services.

It was first founded in 1976.

Facilities
NEA Baptist Memorial hospital has received approval as a Level III trauma center. It has been investing in electronic medical records.

The hospital offers a number of inpatient and outpatient services, emergency care, surgical services including weight loss surgery, neurology, respiratory care, cancer care, and pulmonary rehabilitation. NEA Baptist Memorial Hospital also offers heart care through its Heart Center and labor and delivery services through the hospital's Women's Center. The hospital employs a chef and dieticians.

NEA Baptist Health System has completed a new construction project, $400 million medical campus in Jonesboro, AR. The new campus features NEA Baptist Memorial Hospital, the specialties of NEA Baptist Clinic, and NEA Baptist Cancer Center. The hospital has 223 beds, with capacity for future expansion.

See also
 List of hospitals in Arkansas

References

Hospital buildings completed in 1976
Hospitals in Arkansas
Buildings and structures in Jonesboro, Arkansas